James Lewis may refer to:

Politicians
 J. Hamilton Lewis (1863–1939), United States senator
 James Lewis (Indiana politician) (1930–2016), Democratic member of the Indiana Senate
 James Lewis (Louisiana politician) (1832–1914), Louisiana soldier and politician
 James A. Lewis (politician) (1933–1997), United States Libertarian Party 1984 Vice-Presidential candidate
 James B. Lewis (born 1947), state treasurer of New Mexico
 James M. Lewis (1943–2022), American pharmacist and Tennessee state senator
 James R. Lewis (legislator) (born 1936), Wisconsin Republican state representative
 James T. Lewis (1819–1904), Governor of Wisconsin, 1864–1866
 James Lewis (MP for Cardiganshire) (1601–?), Welsh politician who sat in the House of Commons at various times between 1624 and 1656
 James Lewis (Canadian politician) (1854–1929), member of the Legislative Assembly of New Brunswick

Lawyers
 James A. Lewis (attorney) (born 1940), United States Attorney in Illinois
 James F. Lewis (1836–1886), justice of the Supreme Court of Nevada
 James Woodrow Lewis (1912–1999), chief justice on the South Carolina Supreme Court

Others
 James Lewis (American football) (born 1978), American football defensive back
 James Lewis (actor) (1840–1896), American comic actor
 James Lewis (rugby union) (born 1987), Welsh rugby union footballer
 Flex Lewis (James Lewis, born 1983),  Welsh bodybuilder
 James Lewis (CIA) (1944–1983), CIA agent killed in the 1983 United States embassy bombing
 James Paul Lewis Jr., operated one of the largest and longest running "Ponzi schemes" in United States history
 James R. Lewis (scholar) (born 1949), professional writer and academic specializing in new religious movements and New Age
 James Andrew Lewis (born 1953), American security specialist
 James W. Lewis, American convicted for extortion in relation to the 1982 Chicago Tylenol murders
 James Otto Lewis (1799–1858), American engraver and painter
 James E. Lewis (1923–1997), African-American artist, art collector and curator
Charles Masson (James Lewis, 1800–1853), pseudonymous British soldier, explorer and archaeologist

See also 
 Jimmy Lewis (disambiguation)
 Jim Lewis (disambiguation)
 Lewis (surname)